First-seeded seventeen year-old Helen Wills defeated Molla Mallory6–2, 6–1 in the final to win the women's singles tennis title at the 1923 U.S. National Championships. The event was held at the West Side Tennis Club, Forest Hills, New York City. It was Wills' first U.S. National singles title.

Draw

Final eight

References

1923
1923 in women's tennis
1923 in American women's sports
Women's Singles
1920s in New York City
1923 in sports in New York (state)
Women's sports in New York (state)